The Tapinotaspidini are a tribe of apid bees.

Genera
Arhysoceble
Caenonomada
Chalepogenus
Monoeca
Paratetrapedia
Tapinotaspis
Tapinotaspoides
Trigonopedia

References
C. D. Michener (2000) The Bees of the World, Johns Hopkins University Press.

Apinae
Bee tribes